The Korean International School of Shenzhen (KIS;) is a South Korean international school that opened in 2005. KIS is located near the Nanshan Mountain, within the Shekou Industrial Zone, Nanshan District. KIS is a private international school with 300 students ranging from kindergarten to high school. However, KIS has only one campus, despite the large number of students. This figure has risen over time and continues to rise.

It is one of eight schools in Shenzhen designated for the children of foreign workers as of 2018. The school has an English-language elementary school section, KIS Elementary School in Shenzhen or KISe International Elementary School (KISe).

See also
 Education in Shenzhen
 Koreans in China

References

External links

 Korean International School in Shenzhen

Korean international schools in China
International schools in Shenzhen
High schools in Shenzhen
Educational institutions established in 2005
2005 establishments in China
Private schools in Guangdong